United States women's national goalball team is the women's national team of the United States.  Goalball is a team sport designed specifically for athletes with a vision impairment.  The team takes part in international competitions.

Paralympic Games

1984 New York 

The team competed in the 1984 Summer Paralympics at Long Island, New York City, United States of America.  This was the first time women's teams competed.  They finished first.

1988 Seoul 

The team competed in the 1988 Summer Paralympics, from 15 to 24 October 1988, in Seoul, South Korea.  This was the first time the term "Paralympic" came into official use.  The team finished second.

1992 Barcelona 

The team competed in the 1992 Summer Paralympics, from 3 to 14 September 1992, in the Pavelló de la Vall d'Hebron indoor stadium, Barcelona, Spain.  They finished fifth.

1996 Atlanta 

The team competed in the 1996 Summer Paralympics, from 16 to 25 August 1996, in the GSU Sports Arena building, Atlanta, Georgia, United States of America.  The team finished third.

2000 Sydney 

The team competed in the 2000 Summer Paralympics, between 18 to 29 October 2000, at an Olympic Park indoor hall,  Sydney, New South Wales, Australia.  They finished sixth.

2004 Athens 

The team competed in 2004 Summer Paralympics, between 17 and 28 September 2004, in the Faliro Sports Pavilion Arena, Athens, Greece.  The team finished second.

2008 Beijing 

The team competed in 2008 Summer Paralympics, from 6 to 17 September 2008, in the Beijing Institute of Technology Gymnasium 'bat wing' arena, Beijing, China.  There were 12 men's teams and 8 women's teams taking part in this event.  They finished first, with China second, and Denmark third.

2012 London 

The team competed in the 2012 Summer Paralympics from 30 August to 7 September 2012, in the Copper Box Arena, London, England.  They finished in eighth place.

Quarter-finals

2016 Rio de Janeiro 

The team competed in the 2016 Summer Paralympics, with competition from Thursday 8 September to finals on Friday 16 September 2016, in the temporary Future Arena, Rio de Janeiro, Brazil.

The Algerian women's team did not show up in time for its matches against the United States or Israel.  The team missed connecting flights in Rome after setting out from a training camp in Poland. There were suspicions of a boycott.  The International Paralympic Committee's spokesman, Craig Spence, said: "They are still sticking to their story that they suffered the worst transport issues known to man.  Whether we believe it is a question mark and we are looking into it."  Their first two games were recorded as 10–0 walkover wins for the other team.  The team of Algeria arrived in Rio on 11 September.  Spence remarked: "Fingers crossed they can manage to travel from the (Athletes') Village to the goalball venue in less than six days."

The team got the bronze medal, behind Turkey and China.

Quarter-finals

Semi-finals

Finals

2020 Tokyo 

The team competed in the 2020 Summer Paralympics, with competition from Wednesday 25 August to finals on Friday 3 September 2021, in the Makuhari Messe arena, Chiba, Tokyo, Japan.  They won the assigned IBSA America slot at the 2019 Parapan American Games.

Round-robin

 Quarter-finals

 Semi-finals

 Gold medal match

World Championships

1982 Indianapolis 

The team competed in the 1982 World Championships, at Butler University in Indianapolis, Indiana, United States of America.  The team was one of six teams participating, and they finished first overall.

1986 Roermond 

The 1986 IBSA World Goalball Championships were held in Roermond, the Netherlands.  The team was one of ten teams participating, and they finished first overall.

1990 Calgary  

The team competed in the 1990 World Championships, in Calgary, Alberta, Canada.  The team was one of seven teams participating, and they finished second overall.

1994 Colorado Springs  

The team competed in the 1994 World Championships, in Colorado Springs, Colorado, United States of America.  The team was one of nine teams participating, and they finished eighth overall.

1998 Madrid 

The team competed in the 1998 World Championships, in Madrid, Spain.  The team was one of eleven teams participating, and they finished third overall.

2002 Rio de Janeiro  

The team competed in the 2002 World Championships, in Rio de Janeiro, Brazil, from 30 August 2002 to 8 September 2002.  The team was one of ten teams participating, and they finished first overall.

2006 Spartanburg  

As the host nation, the team competed in the 2006 World Championships, in July 2006, in Spartanburg, South Carolina, United States of America.

Beaten by China 3:2 in the semi-finals, USA beat Denmark 4:2 to get the bronze medal.

2010 Sheffield 

The team competed in the 2010 World Championships, from 20 to 25 June 2010, in Sheffield, England, in Pool X, winning all their games against Australia, Canada, Greece, Israel, and Sweden.

The team beat all competition in their pool: Canada 6:1, Israel 3:1, Australia 7:4, Sweden 5:0, and Greece 3:1.

2014 Espoo  

The team competed in the 2014 World Championships from 30 June to 5 July 2014, in Espoo, Finland.  They placed fourth of six in Pool X, winning against Finland 7:2 and Germany 4:3, but being beaten by Russia 0:3, Turkey 2:8, and Japan 3:4.  They progressed to the quarter-finals, beating Brazil 5:3, and going to the semi-finals, where they beat Japan 2:0.  In the gold medal match, they beat Russian 3:0 to take the gold medal.

Athletes were: Jennifer Armbruster (#1), Amanda Dennis (#2), Jordan Gist (#6), Marybai Huking (#7), Eliana Mason (#9), and Asya Miller (#4).

2018 Malmö 

The team competed in the 2018 World Championships from 3 to 8 June 2018, at the Baltiska Hallen, Malmö, Sweden.  They placed third of six in Pool D, lost to Turkey 2:12 in the quarter-finals, and placed sixth in final standings.

Representing the 2018 team for the championships are: Lisa Czechowski (Fort Wayne, Indiana), Amanda Dennis (Peachtree City, Georgia), Marybai Huking (Plain City, Utah), Eliana Mason (Beaverton, Oregon), Asya Miller (Portland, Oregon), Bryanna Stubbert (Oceanside, California).  Stubbert was new to the team.  Head coach was Jake Czechowski (Fort Wayne, Indiana).  Former national goalball high-performance director John Potts was appointed as team leader for both the men's and women's teams.

2022 Matosinhos 

The team secured a berth in the 2022 World Championships, by placing second in the 2020 Paralympic Games.

The team competed in the 2022 World Championships from 7 to 16 December 2022, at the Centro de Desportos e Congressos de Matosinhos, Portugal.  There were sixteen men's and sixteen women's teams.  They placed third in Pool B, and sixth in final standings.

Regional championships 

The team competes in the IBSA America goalball region.  The winner of the championships usually qualifies for a berth at the World Championships or the Paralympic Games.

2005 São Paulo 

The team competed at the 2005 IBSA Goalball Americas Regional Championships which were part of the Fourth IBSA Pan-American Games, the competition being from Monday 5 September 2005 to Friday 9 September 2005, in São Paulo, Brazil.  There were three women's teams competing: Brazil, Canada, and USA.  Brazil finished first, with the United States second and Canada third.

2011 Guadalajara 

The team competed at the 2011 Parapan American Games from 13 to 19 November 2011, at the San Rafael Gymnasium in Guadalajara, Mexico.  There were five women's teams: Brazil, Canada, El Salvador, Mexico, USA.  Athletes were: Jennifer Armbruster, Nicole Buck, Lisa Czechowski, Amanda Dennis, Asya Miller, and Robin Theryoung.

USA beat Brazil for the gold medal.

2013 Colorado Springs 

The team competed at the 2013 Parapan American Games (which also hosted the 2013 IBSA World Youth Championships) from 11 to 14 July 2013, at Colorado Springs, Colorado, USA.  There were three women's teams: Brazil, Canada, USA.  Athletes were Jen Armbruster (Portland, OR), Lisa Czechowski (Tucson, AZ), Amanda Dennis (Peachtree City, GA), Jordan Gist (Fargo, ND), Asya Miller (Portland, OR), and Cathy Morgan (Logan, UT).

USA beat Brazil for the gold medal.

2015 Toronto 

The team competed at the 2015 Parapan American Games from 8 August 2015 to 15 August 2015, at the Mississauga Sports Centre, Toronto, Ontario, Canada.  There were six women's teams: Brazil, Canada, El Salvador, Guatemala, Nicaragua, USA.  Athletes were: Jennifer Armbruster, Lisa Czechowski, Amanda Dennis, Marybai Huking, Eliana Mason, and Asya Miller.

USA came second to Brazil.

2017 São Paulo 

The team competed at the 2017 IBSA Goalball Americas Championships from Wednesday 29 November 2017 to Sunday 3 December 2017, at São Paulo, Brazil.  There were six women's teams: Brazil, Canada, Costa Rica, Mexico, Peru, USA.

United States came third behind Brazil and Canada.

2019 Lima 

The team competed at the 2019 Parapan American Games from 23 August 2019 to 1 September 2019, at the Miguel Grau Coliseum, Lima, Peru.  This championships was a qualifier for the 2020 Paralympic Games.  There were six women's teams: Brazil, Canada, Costa Rica, Mexico, Peru, USA.

USA came second to Brazil in the finals.

2022 São Paulo 

Due to the ongoing COVID-19 pandemic, the IBSA America championship moved from 6 to 13 November 2021, to 18 to 22 February 2022.  The event is being held at the Centro de Treinamento Paralímpico (Paralympic Training Center) in São Paulo.  This championships is a qualifier for the 2022 World Championships.

There are twelve women's teams: Argentina, Brazil, Canada, Chile, Colombia, Costa Rica, Guatemala, Mexico, Nicaragua, Peru, USA, Venezuela.

The team is Lisa Czechowski (Boonton, NJ), Libby Daugherty (Mesquite, TX), Ali Lawson Trippe (Jasper, GA), Eliana Mason (Beaverton, OR), Asya Miller (Portland, OR), and Jake Czechowski (head coach), John Potts (assistant coach), Jennifer Brown (trainer).

Competitive history 

The table below contains individual game results for the team in international matches and competitions.

Goal scoring by competition

See also 

 Disabled sports
 United States men's national goalball team
 United States at the Paralympics

References

Goalball women's
National women's goalball teams
United States at the Paralympics
Goalball in the United States
Goalball in the Americas